Keep Calm and Carry On is the seventh studio album by Welsh rock band Stereophonics. Released by Mercury on 16 November 2009, the album debuted at number 11 with sales of 42,771 on the UK Albums Chart, the lowest position for a studio album released by the band. The album was named after a British World War II poster of the same name. Keep Calm and Carry On was the first studio album by the band to feature guitarist Adam Zindani as a permanent member of the band. In the initial months after release, fans could access bonus content from the band's website with their copy of the album. This featured videos of a Track By Track rundown of the album, a Welcome Message from the group, the photoshoot for the album, and live audio of "You're My Star" (Acoustic) and "I Stopped to Fill My Car Up" from the Greatest Hits tour.

Release

Reception

Critical reception of the album was generally mixed. At Metacritic, which assigns a normalized rating out of 100 to reviews from mainstream critics, the album has received an average score of 59, based on 8 reviews. The Sunday Times called it "their best album yet" but BBC critic Will Dean wrote "musically it's as solid as you'd expect [...] [b]ut Keep Calm... is unlikely to win Stereophonics any new fans," while Andy Gill, for The Independent, concluded that "overall, what comes across from Keep Calm and Carry On is confusion."

Track listing

Deluxe edition CD/DVD

This deluxe edition of Keep Calm and Carry On, as well as containing the actual album, houses additional pictures and a bonus DVD. The DVD gives a backstage look into the Decade in the Sun: The Best of Stereophonics tour, and also footage of the recording process for the album. Hidden live content from Riverside Studios (originally only showcased online by Babelgum) and the Isle of Wight Festival 2009 is also included

Track listing
Keep Calm and Carry On - In the Studio
Just Looking - Behind the Scenes of the 2008 Greatest Hits Arena Tour

Hidden Content
Live at Riverside Studios
"Innocent" (Isle of Wight Festival 2009)

Personnel

Stereophonics
 Kelly Jones – lead vocals, guitar
 Richard Jones – bass
 Adam Zindani – guitar, backing vocals
 Javier Weyler – drums

Additional
 Niel Cowley – piano, Wurlitzer, organ on track 2, 3, 4, 12
 Jim Abbiss – piano, percussion on track 1. Piano on track 2. Organ on track 3, 4, 5. Synthesizer on track 3. Vibraphone on track 5.
 Arnulf Lindner – cello on track 12

Technical personnel
 Production – Kelly Jones, Jim Abbiss
 Production on track 7 – Jones
 Production on track 8, 9 – Jones, Jim Lowe
 Mixing – Barny Barnicott
 Additional mixing – Lowe
 Mixing on track 9 – Lowe
 Engineering – Jonathan Shakhovskoy
 Additional Engineering – Tom Hough, Helen Atkinson, Ian Sherwin
 Mastering – John Davis

Charts and certifications

References

External links
 Keep Calm and Carry On at Stereophonics.com

2009 albums
Stereophonics albums
V2 Records albums
Albums produced by Jim Abbiss

pl:Keep Calm and Carry On